Northern Epirus (Vórios Ípiros;) is a term used to refer to those parts of the historical region of Epirus, in the western Balkans, which today are part of Albania. The term is used mostly by Greeks and is associated with the existence of a substantial ethnic Greek minority in the region. It also has connotations with irredentist political claims on the territory on the grounds that it was held by Greece and in 1914 was declared an independent state by the local Greeks against annexation to the newly founded Albanian principality. The term is typically rejected by most Albanians for its irredentist associations.

It started to be used by Greeks in 1913, upon the creation of the Albanian state following the Balkan Wars, and the incorporation into the latter of territory that was regarded by many Greeks as geographically, historically, culturally, and ethnologically connected to the Greek region of Epirus since antiquity. In the spring of 1914, the Autonomous Republic of Northern Epirus was proclaimed by ethnic Greeks in the territory and recognized by the Albanian government, though it proved short-lived as Albania collapsed with the onset of World War I. Greece held the area between 1914 and 1916 and unsuccessfully tried to annex it in March 1916. In 1917 Greek forces were driven from the area by Italy, who took over most of Albania. The Paris Peace Conference of 1919 awarded the area to Greece, however the area reverted to Albanian control in November 1921, following Greece's defeat in the Greco-Turkish War. During the interwar period, tensions remained high due to the educational issues surrounding the Greek minority in Albania. Following Italy's invasion of Greece from the territory of Albania in 1940 and the successful Greek counterattack, the Greek army briefly held Northern Epirus for a six-month period until the German invasion of Greece in 1941.

Tensions remained high during the Cold War, as the Greek minority was subjected to repressive measures (along with the rest of the country's population). Although a Greek minority was recognized by the Hoxha regime, this recognition only applied to an "official minority zone" consisting of 99 villages, leaving out important areas of Greek settlement, such as Himara. People outside the official minority zone received no education in the Greek language, which was prohibited in public. The Hoxha regime also diluted the ethnic demographics of the region by relocating Greeks living there and settling in their stead Albanians from other parts of the country. Relations began to improve in the 1980s with Greece's abandonment of any territorial claims over Northern Epirus and the lifting of the official state of war between the two countries. In the post Cold War era relations have continued to improve though tensions remain over the availability of education in the Greek language outside the official minority zone, property rights, and occasional violent incidents targeting members of the Greek minority.

Name and definition
The Greek toponym Epirus, meaning "mainland" or "continent", first appears in the work of Hecataeus of Miletus in the 6th century BC and is one of the few Greek names from the view of an external observer with a maritime-geographical perspective. Although not originally a native Epirote name, it later came to be adopted by the inhabitants of the area. The term Epirus is used both in the Albanian and Greek language, but in Albanian refers only to the historical and not the modern region. The term Northern Epirus rather than a clearly defined geographical term, is largely a political and diplomatic term applied to those areas partly populated by ethnic Greeks that were incorporated into the newly independent Albanian state in 1913. The term "Northern Epirus" was first used in official Greek correspondence in 1886, to describe the northern parts of the Janina Vilayet. According to the 20th century definition, Northern Epirus stretches from the Ceraunian Mountains north of Himara southward to the Greek border, and from the Ionian coast to Lake Prespa. Some of the cities and towns of the region are: Himarë, Sarandë, Delvinë, Gjirokastër, Korçë, and the once prosperous town of Moscopole. The region defined as Northern Epirus thus stretches further east than classical Epirus, and includes parts of the historical region Macedonia. Northern Epirus is rugged, characterized by steep limestone ridges that parallel the Ionian coast, with deep valleys between them. The main rivers of the area are: Vjosë/Aoos (Aoos) its tributary the Drino (Drinos), the Osum ( Apsos) and the Devoll ( Eordaikos).

In antiquity, the northern border of the historical region of Epirus (and of the ancient Greek world) was the Gulf of Oricum,
 or alternatively, the mouth of the Aoös river, immediately to the north of the Bay of Aulon (modern-day Vlorë). The northern boundary of Epirus was unclear both due to political instability and the coexistence of Greek and non-Greek populations, notably Illyrians, such as in Apollonia. From the 4th century BCE onward, with a degree of certainty, the boundaries of Epirus included the Ceraunian mountains in the north, the Pindus mountains in the east, the Ionian Sea in the West, and the Ambracian Gulf in the south.

Minority zone

In 1921-1991, there were minority zones where members of national minorities in Albania could exercise their cultural rights. In accordance with the final settlement in the League of Nations on minority populations in Albania, a specific minority zone was established for communities where the majority identified as Greeks in the territory of Albania in 1921. The League of Nations recognized as part of the minority zone 99 settlements in the Gjirokastër-Sarandë areas and 3 villages in Himara (Himarë, Palasë, Dhërmi). After 1945, the minority zone was re-established by the new Albanian government under the Communist Party of Albania and excluded the three villages along the Himara coast. Greeks as an officially recognized national minority held co-equal cultural and political rights within these communities but as these rights were defined on a territorial basis, they were largely absent outside the minority zone. As such, education in Greek which was institutionally protected within the minority zone as well as other rights, didn't exist outside this zone and was subject to geographical restrictions.

After 1991, rights which were exclusive to the minority zone were gradually made non-geographical and applicable throughout Albania. As such, the Law on Protection of National Minorities (2017) explicitly stipulates that linguistic and cultural rights of minorities can be exercised "in the entire territory of Albania". The right to education (funded by state institutions) and the right to use a non-Albanian language in local administration are partially defined territorially and require that at least 20% of the population of an area has to belong to a minority community and request the exercise of such rights.

History

Ottoman period
The local Ottoman authority was mainly exercised by Muslim Albanians. There were specific parts of Epirus that enjoyed local autonomy, such as Himarë, Droviani, or Moscopole. In spite of the Ottoman presence, Christianity prevailed in many areas and became an important reason for preserving the Greek language, which was also the language of trade. Between the 16th and 19th centuries, inhabitants of the region participated in the Greek Enlightenment. One of the leading figures of that period, the Orthodox missionary Cosmas of Aetolia, traveled and preached extensively in northern Epirus, founding the Acroceraunian School in Himara in 1770. It is believed that he founded more than 200 Greek schools until his execution by Turkish authorities near Berat. In addition, the Moscopole printing house, the first in the Balkans after that of Constantinople, was founded in Moscopole. From the mid-18th century trade in the region was thriving and a great number of educational facilities and institutions were founded throughout the rural regions and the major urban centers as benefactions by several Epirot entrepreneurs. In Korçë a special community fund was established that aimed at the foundation of Greek cultural institutions.

During this period a number of uprisings against the Ottoman Empire periodically broke out. In the Orlov Revolt (1770) several units of Riziotes, Chormovites and Himariotes supported the armed operation. Some Greeks from the area took also part in the Greek War of Independence (1821–1830): many locals revolted, organized armed groups and joined the revolution. The most distinguished personalities were the engineer Konstantinos Lagoumitzis from Hormovo and Spyromilios from Himarë. The latter was one of the most active generals of the revolutionaries and participated in several major armed conflicts, such as the Third Siege of Missolonghi, where Lagoumitzis was the defenders' chief engineer. Spyromilios also became a prominent political figure after the creation of the modern Greek state and discreetly supported the revolt of his compatriots in Ottoman-occupied Epirus in 1854. Another uprising in 1878, in the Saranda-Delvina region, with the revolutionaries demanding union with Greece, was suppressed by the Ottoman forces, while in 1881, the Treaty of Berlin awarded to Greece the southernmost parts of Epirus.

According to the Ottoman "Millet" system, religion was a major marker of ethnicity, and thus all Orthodox Christians (Greeks, Aromanians, Orthodox Albanians, Slavs etc.) were classified as "Greeks", while all Muslims (including Muslim Albanians, Greeks, Slavs etc.) were considered "Turks". The dominant view in Greece considers Orthodox Christianity an integral element of the Hellenic heritage, as part of its Byzantine past. Thus, official Greek government policy from c. 1850 to c. 1950, adopted the view that speech was not a decisive factor for the establishment of a Greek national identity.

Balkan Wars (1912–13)

With the outbreak of the First Balkan War (1912–13) and the Ottoman defeat, the Greek army entered the region. The outcome of the following Peace Treaties of London and of Bucharest, signed at the end of the Second Balkan War, was unpopular among both Greeks and Albanians, as settlements of the two people existed on both sides of the border: the southern part of Epirus was ceded to Greece, while Northern Epirus, already under the control of the Greek army, was awarded to the newly found Albanian State. However, due to the late emergence and fluidity of Albanian national identity and an absence of religious Albanian institutions, loyalty in Northern Epirus especially amongst the Orthodox to potential Albanian rule headed by (Albanian) Muslim leaders was not guaranteed.

Autonomous Republic of Northern Epirus (1914)

In accordance with the wishes of the local Greek population, the Autonomous Republic of Northern Epirus, centered in Gjirokastër on account of the latter's large Greek population, was declared in March 1914 by the pro-Greek party, which was in power in southern Albania at that time. Georgios Christakis-Zografos, a distinguished Greek politician from Lunxhëri, took the initiative and became the head of the Republic. Fighting broke out in Northern Epirus between Greek irregulars and Muslim Albanians who opposed the Northern Epirot movement. In May, autonomy was confirmed with the Protocol of Corfu, signed by Albanian and Northern Epirote representatives and approved by the Great Powers. The signing of the Protocol ensured that the region would have its own administration, recognized the rights of the local Greeks and provided self-government under nominal Albanian sovereignty.

However, the agreement was never fully implemented, because when World War I broke out in July, Albania collapsed. Although short-lived, the Autonomous Republic of Northern Epirus left behind a substantial historical record, such as its own postage stamps.

World War I and following peace treaties (1914–21)
Under an October 1914 agreement among the Allies, Greek forces re-entered Northern Epirus and the Italians seized the Vlore region. Greece officially annexed Northern Epirus in March 1916, but was forced to revoke by the Great Powers. During the war the French Army occupied the area around Korçë in 1916, and established the Republic of Korçë. In 1917 Greece lost control of the rest of Northern Epirus to Italy, who by then had taken over most of Albania. The Paris Peace Conference of 1919 awarded the area to Greece after World War I, however, political developments such as the Greek defeat in the Greco-Turkish War (1919–22) and, crucially, Italian, Austrian and German lobbying in favor of Albania resulted in the area being ceded to Albania in November 1921.

Interwar period (1921–39) - Zog's regime
The Albanian Government, with the country's entrance to the League of Nations (October 1921), made the commitment to respect the social, educational, religious rights of every minority. Questions arose over the size of the Greek minority, with the Albanian government claiming 16,000, and the League of Nations estimating it at 35,000-40,000. In the event, only a limited area in the Districts of Gjirokastër, Sarandë and four villages in Himarë region consisting of 15,000 inhabitants was recognized as a Greek minority zone.

The following years, measures were taken to suppress the minority's education. The Albanian state viewed Greek education as a potential threat to its territorial integrity, while most of the teaching staff was considered suspicious and in favour for the Northern Epirus movement. In October 1921, the Albanian government recognised minority rights and legalised Greek schools only in Greek speaking settlements located within the "recognised minority zone". Within the rest of the country, Greek schools were either closed or forcibly converted to Albanian schools and teachers were expelled from the country. During the mid 1920s, attempts at opening Greek schools and teacher training colleges in urban areas with sizable Greek populations were met with difficulties which resulted in an absence of urban Greek schools in coming years. 
With the intervention of the League of Nations in 1935, a limited number of schools, and only of those inside the officially recognized zone, were reopened. The 360 schools of the pre-World War I period were reduced dramatically in the following years and education in Greek was finally eliminated altogether in 1935:

1926: 78, 1927: 68, 1928: 66, 1929: 60, 1930: 63, 1931: 64, 1932: 43, 1933: 10, 1934: 0

During this period, the Albanian state led efforts to establish an independent orthodox church (contrary to the Protocol of Corfu), thereby reducing the influence of Greek language in the country's south. According to a 1923 law, priests who were not Albanian speakers, as well as not of Albanian origin, were excluded from this new autocephalous church. In addition, Italy persecuted the Greeks of the region indirectly, with its policy.

World War II (1939–45)

In 1939, Albania became an Italian protectorate and was used to facilitate military operations against Greece the following year. The Italian attack, launched at October 28, 1940 was quickly repelled by the Greek forces. The Greek army, although facing a numerically and technologically superior army, counterattacked and in the next month managed to enter Northern Epirus. Northern Epirus thus became the site of the first clear setback for the Axis powers. However, after a six-month period of Greek administration, the invasion of Greece by Nazi Germany followed in April 1941 and Greece capitulated.

Following Greece's surrender, Northern Epirus again became part of the Italian-occupied Albanian protectorate. Many Northern Epirotes formed resistance groups and organizations in the struggle against the occupation forces. In 1942 the Northern Epirote Liberation Organization (EAOVI, also called MAVI) was formed. Some others, c. 1,500 joined the left-wing Albanian National Liberation Army, in which they formed three separate battalion (named Thanasis Zikos, Pantelis Botsaris, Lefteris Talios). During the latter stages of the war, the Albanian communists were able to stop contact between the minority and the right-wing soldiers of EDES in southern Epirus, that wanted to unite Northern Epirus with Greece .

When the war ended and the communists gained power in Albania, a United States Senate resolution demanded the cession of the region to the Greek state, but according to the following post war international peace treaties it remained part of the Albanian state.

Cold War period (1945–91) - Hoxha's regime

General violations of human and minority rights
After World War II, Albania was governed by a Stalinist regime led by Enver Hoxha, which suppressed the minority (along with the rest of the population) and took measures to disperse it or at least keep it loyal to Albania. Pupils were taught only Albanian history and culture at primary level, the minority zone was reduced from 103 to 99 villages (excluding Himarë), many Greeks were forcibly removed from the minority zones to other parts of the country, thereby losing their fundamental minority rights (as a product of communist population policy, an important and constant element of which was to pre-empt ethnic sources of political dissent). Greek place-names were changed to Albanian ones, and Greeks were forced to change their personal names into Albanian names. Archeological sites of the Ancient Greek and Roman era were also presented as "Illyrian" by the state. The use of the Greek language, prohibited everywhere outside the minority zones, was prohibited for many official purposes within them as well. As a result of these policies, relations with Greece remained extremely tense throughout most of the Cold War. On the other hand, Enver Hoxha favored a few specific members of the minority, offering them prominent positions within the country's system, as part of his "tokenism" policy. However, when the Soviet General Secretary Nikita Khrushchev asked about giving more rights to the minority, even autonomy, the answer was negative.

Censorship
Strict censorship was introduced in communist Albania as early as 1944, while the press remained under tight dictatorial control right up until the end of the Eastern Bloc (1991). In 1945, Laiko Vima, a propaganda organ of the Party of Labour of Albania, was the only printed media that was allowed to be published in Greek and was accessible only within Gjirokastër District.

Resettlement policy
Although the Greek minority had some limited rights, during that period a number of Muslim Cham Albanians, that were expelled from Greece after World War II, were given new homes in the area, diluting the local Greek element. Albanian resettlement policy included Muslim Albanian villagers who as state employees were resettled in newly created villages that served as a buffer zone between the recognized Greek 'minority zone' and traditionally Orthodox Albanian speaking regions of internally polarized national identity, as well as the permanent settlement of Albanian populations inside the minority zone and in other traditionally Greek speaking regions, such as in Himara.

Isolation and labour camps
Stalinist Albania, already isolated after de-Stalinization and the death of Mao Zedong (1976), restricted visitors to 6,000 per year, and segregated those few that traveled to Albania. The country was virtually isolated and common penalties for attempts to escape the country, for ethnic Greeks, were execution for the offenders and exile for their families, usually in mining camps in central and northern Albania. The regime maintained twenty-nine prisons and labour camps throughout Albania, that were filled with more than 30,000 "enemies of the state" year after year. It was unofficially reported that a large percentage of the imprisoned were ethnic Greeks. During this time, some Greeks and Orthodox Albanians with a Greek national consciousness managed to flee Albania and resettle in Greece.

Prohibition of religion
The state attempted to suppress any religious practice (both public and private), adherence to which was considered "anti-modern" and dangerous to the unity of the Albanian state. The process started in 1949, with the confiscation and nationalization of Orthodox Church property and intensified in 1967 when the authorities conducted a violent campaign to extinguish all religious life in Albania, claiming that it had divided the Albanian nation and kept it mired in backwardness. Student agitators combed the countryside, likewise forcing Albanians and Greeks to quit practicing their faith. All churches, mosques, monasteries and other religious institutions were closed or converted into warehouses, gymnasiums, and workshops. Clergy were imprisoned, and owning an icon became an offense that could be prosecuted under Albanian law. The campaign culminated in an announcement that Albania had become the world's first atheistic state, a feat touted as one of Enver Hoxha's greatest achievements. Christians were prohibited from mentioning Orthodoxy even in their own homes, visiting their parents' graves, light memorial candles or make the sign of the Cross. In this respect, the campaign against religions hit ethnic Greeks disproportionately, since affiliation to the Eastern Orthodox rite has traditionally been a strong component of Greek identity.

1980s thaw
The first serious attempt to improve relations was initiated by Greece in the 1980s, during the government of Andreas Papandreou. In 1984, during a speech in Epirus, Papandreou declared that the inviolability of European borders as stipulated in the Helsinki Final Act of 1975, to which Greece was a signatory, applied to the Greek-Albanian border. The most significant change occurred on 28 August 1987, when the Greek Cabinet lifted the state of war that had been declared since November 1940. At the same time, Papandreou deplored the "miserable condition under which the Greeks in Albania live".

Post-communist period (1991-present)
Beginning in 1990, large number of Albanian citizens, including members of the Greek minority, began seeking refuge in Greece. This exodus turned into a flood by 1991, creating a new reality in Greek-Albanian relations. With the fall of communism in 1991, Orthodox churches were reopened and religious practices were permitted after 35 years of strict prohibition. Moreover, Greek-language education was initially expanded. In 1991 ethnic Greeks shops in the town of Saranda were attacked, and inter-ethnic relations throughout Albania worsened. Greek-Albanian tensions escalated in November 1993 when seven Greek schools were forcibly closed by the Albanian police. A purge of ethnic Greeks in the professions in Albania continued in 1994, with particular emphasis in law and the military.

Trial of the Omonoia Five
Tensions increased when on 20 May 1994 the Albanian Government took into custody five members of the ethnic Greek advocacy organization Omonoia on the charge of high treason, accusing them of secessionist activities and illegal possession of weapons (a sixth member was added later). Sentences of six to eight years were handed down. The accusations, the manner in which the trial was conducted and its outcome were strongly criticized by Greece as well as international organizations. Greece responded by freezing all EU aid to Albania, sealing its border with Albania, and between August–November 1994, expelling
over 115,000 illegal Albanian immigrants, a figure quoted in the US Department of State Human Rights Report and given to the American authorities by their Greek counterpart. Tensions increased even further when the Albanian government drafted a law requiring the head of the Orthodox Church in Albania be born in Albania, which would force the then head of the church, the Greek Archbishop Anastasios of Albania from his post. In December 1994, however, Greece began to permit limited EU aid to Albania as a gesture of goodwill, while Albania released two of the Omonoia defendants and reduced the sentences of the remaining four. In 1995, the remaining defendants were released on suspended sentences.

Recent years

In recent years relations have significantly improved; Greece and Albania signed a Friendship, Cooperation, Good Neighborliness and Security Agreement on March 21, 1996. 

Although relations between Albania and Greece have greatly improved in recent years, the Greek minority in Albania continues to suffer discrimination particularly regarding education in the Greek language, property rights of the minority, and violent incidents against the minority by nationalist extremists. Tensions resurfaced during local government elections in Himara in 2000, when a number of incidents of hostility towards the Greek minority took place, as well as with the defacing of signposts written in Greek in the country's south by Albanian nationalist elements, and more recently following the death of Aristotelis Goumas. There has been a growing campaign by the Albanian government to demolish ethnic Greek homes. According to diplomatic sources , there has recently been an upsurge in nationalist activity among Albanians targeting the Greek minority, especially following the ruling of the International Court of Justice in favor of Kosovo's independence.

Demographics

In Albania, Greeks are considered a "national minority". There were no reliable statistics on the size of any ethnic minorities, while the latest official census (2011) has been widely disputed due to boycott and irregularities in the procedure.

In general Albania and Greece hold different and often conflicting estimations, as they have done so for the last 20 years. According to data presented to the 1919 Paris Conference, by the Greek side, the Greek minority numbered 120,000, but a CIA report of 1948 put the number at 35,000. The 1989 census under the communist regime cited  58,785 Greeks, while estimations by the Albanian government during the early 1990s raised the number to 80,000.

Most non-Albanian sources have placed the number of ethnic Greeks in Albania, including those who have moved to live in Greece, to be approximately 200,000, while Greek sources claim that there are around 300,000 ethnic Greeks in Albania. As Albanians and Greeks hold different views on what constitutes a Greek in Albania, the total number fluctuates greatly which explains the inconsistent totals provided within Albania and Greece and from external agencies, organisations and sources. Community groups representing Albania's Greeks in Greece have given a 286,000 sum. Furthermore the Migration Policy Institute has noted that 189,000 Albanian immigrants of Greek ancestry live in Greece as 'co-ethnics', a title reserved for Albania's Greek community members.

However, the area studied was confined to the southern border, and this estimate is considered to be low. Under this definition, minority status was limited to those who lived in 99 villages in the southern border areas, thereby excluding important concentrations of Greek settlement and making the minority seem smaller than it is. Sources from the Greek minority have claimed that there are up to 400,000 Greeks in Albania, or 12% of the total population at the time (from the "Epirot lobby" of Greeks with family roots in Albania). According to Ian Jeffries in 1993, most western estimates of the minority's size put it at around 200,000, or ~6% of the population, though a large number, possibly two thirds, has migrated to Greece in recent years.

The Unrepresented Nations and Peoples Organization estimates the Greek minority at approximately 70,000 people. Other independent sources estimate that the number of Greeks in Northern Epirus is 117,000 (about 3.5% of the total population), a figure close to the estimate provided by The World Factbook (2006) (about 3%). But this number was 8% by the same agency a year before. The 2014 CIA World Factbook estimate put the Greek minority at 0.9%, which is based on the disputed 2011 census. A 2003 survey conducted by Greek scholars estimate the size of the Greek minority at around 60.000. The US State Department uses a 1.17% figure for Greeks in Albania. The total population of Northern Epirus is estimated to be around 577,000 (2002), with main ethnic groups being Albanians, Greeks and Aromanians. In addition an estimated of 189,000 ethnic Greeks who are Albanian citizens reside in Greece.

The Greek minority in Albania is located compactly, within the wider Gjirokastër and Sarandë regions and in four settlements within the coastal Himarë area where they form an overall majority population. Greek speaking settlements are also found within Përmet municipality, near the border. Some Greek speakers are also located within the wider Korçë region. Due to both forced and voluntary internal migration of Greeks within Albania during the communist era, some Greek speakers are also located within the wider Përmet and Tepelenë regions. Outside the area defined as Northern Epirus, two coastal Greek speaking villages exist near Vlorë. While due to forced and non-forced internal population movements of Greeks within Albania during the communist era, some Greek speakers are also dispersed within the wider Berat, Durrës, Kavajë, Peqin, Elbasan and Tiranë regions. In the post-1990 period, like many other minorities elsewhere in Balkans, the Greek population has diminished because of heavy migration. However after the Greek economic crisis (2009), members of the Greek minority returned to Albania.

The Northern Epirote issue at present

While violent incidents have declined in recent years, the ethnic Greek minority has pursued grievances with the government regarding electoral zones, Greek-language education, and property rights. On the other hand, minority representatives complain of the government's unwillingness to recognize the possible existence of ethnic Greek towns outside communist-era 'minority zones'; to utilize Greek on official documents and on public signs in ethnic Greek areas; to ascertain the size of the ethnic Greek population; and to include more ethnic Greeks in public administration. There have been many minor incidents between the Greek population and Albanian authorities over issues such as the alleged involvement of the Greek government in local politics, the raising of the Greek flag on Albanian territory, and the language taught in state schools of the region; however, these issues have, for the most part, been non-violent.

Protests against irregularities in 2011 census

The census of October 2011 included ethnicity for the first time in post-communist Albania, a long-standing demand of the Greek minority and of international organizations. However, Greek representatives already found this procedure unacceptable due to article 20 of the Census law, which was proposed by the nationalist oriented Party for Justice, Integration and Unity and accepted by the Albanian government. According to this, there is a $1,000 fine for someone who will declare anything other than what was written down on his birth certificate, including certificates from the communist-era where minority status was limited to only 99 villages. Indeed, Omonoia unanimously decided to boycott the census, since it violates the fundamental right of self-determination. Moreover, the Greek government called its Albanian counterpart for urgent action, since the right of free self-determination is not being guaranteed under these circumstances. Vasil Bollano, the head of Omonoia declared that: "We, as minority representatives, state that we do not acknowledge this process, nor its product and we are calling our members to refrain from participating in a census that does not serve the solution of current problems, but their worsening".

According to the census, there were 17,622 Greeks in the country's south (counties of Gjirokastër, Vlorë, and Berat) while 24,243 in Albania in general. Apart from these numbers, an additional 17.29% of the population of those counties refused to answer the optional question of ethnicity (compared to 13.96% of the total population in Albania). On the other hand, Omonoia conducted its own census in order to count the members of the ethnic Greek minority. A total of 286,852 were counted, which equals to ca. 10% of the population of the country. During the time the census was conducted, half of these individuals resided permanently in Greece, but 70% visit their country of origin at least three times a year.

Minority's representation on local and state politics

The minority's sociopolitical organization from promotion of Greek human rights, Omonoia, founded in January 1991, took an active role on minority issues. Omonoia was banned in the parliamentary elections of March 1991, because it violated the Albanian law which forbade 'formation of parties on a religious, ethnic and regional basis'. This situation resulted in a number of strong protests not only from the Greek side, but also from international organizations. Finally, on behalf of Omonoia, the Unity for Human Rights Party contested at the following elections, a party which aims to represent that Greek minority in the Albanian parliament.

In more recent years, tensions have surrounded the participation of candidates of the Unity for Human Rights Party in Albanian elections. In 2000, the Albanian municipal elections were criticised by international human rights groups for "serious irregularities" reported to have been directed against ethnic Greek candidates and parties.

The municipal elections held in February 2007 saw the participation of a number of ethnic Greek candidates. Vasilis Bolanos was re-elected mayor of the southern town of Himarë despite the governing and opposition Albanian parties fielding a combined candidate against him. Greek observers have expressed concern at the "non-conformity of procedure" in the conduct of the elections. In 2015, Jorgo Goro, supported by the Socialist Party of Albania became the new mayor of Himara. Goro who himself had acquired Greek citizenship as a member of the minority declared in his election campaign that "there are no Greeks in Himara" and that he had changed his name from "Gjergj" to "Jorgo". The Greek state revoked his citizenship in 2017 on grounds of him "acting against national interests". In 2019 the candidacy of the representative of Omonoia, Fredi Beleri was rejected by the Albanian authorities due to a three-year conviction in the past. Albanian electoral law allows participation in elections as a candidate after 10 years have passed from the later conviction of a candidate. In the following election most of the Greek minority abstained from the procedure and Goro was re-elected. Several irregularities were also reported during the elections.

In 2004, there were five ethnic Greek members in the Albanian Parliament, and two ministers in the Albanian cabinet. The same number of parliamentary members were elected in the 2017 Albanian parliamentary election.

Land distribution and property in post-communist Albania
The return to Albania of ethnic Greeks that were expelled during the past regime seemed possible after 1991. However, the return of their confiscated properties is even now impossible, due to Albanian's inability to compensate the present owners. Moreover, the full return of the Orthodox Church property also seems impossible for the same reasons.

Education

Greek education in the region was thriving during the late Ottoman period (18th-19th centuries). When the First World War broke out in 1914, 360 Greek language schools were functioning in Northern Epirus (as well as in Elbasan, Berat, Tirana) with 23,000 students. During the following decades the majority of Greek schools were closed and Greek education was prohibited in most districts. In the post-communist period (after 1991), the reopening of schools was one of the major objectives of the minority. In April 2005 a bilingual Greek-Albanian school in Korçë, and after many years of efforts, a private Greek school was opened in the Himara municipality in spring of 2006.

Official positions

Greece
In 1991, the Greek Prime Minister Konstantinos Mitsotakis specified that the issue, according to the Greek minority in Albania, focuses on 6 major topics that the post-communist Albanian government should deal with:
The return of the confiscated property of the Orthodox Church and the freedom of religious practice.
Functioning of Greek language schools (both public and private) in all the areas that Greek populations are concentrated.
The Greek minority should be allowed to found cultural, religious, educational and social organizations.
Illegal dismissals of members of the Greek minority from the country's public sector should be stopped and same rights for admission should be granted (on every level) for every citizen.
The Greek families that left Albania during the communist regime (1945–1991), should be encouraged to return to Albania and acquire their lost properties.
The Albanian government should take the initiative to conduct a census on ethnological basis and give its citizens the right to choose their ethnicity without limitations.

Albania
In 1993, the Albanian authorities admitted for the first time that Greek minority members exist not only in the designated 'minority zones' but all over Albania.

Incidents

 In April 1994, Albania announced that unknown individuals attacked a military camp near the Greek-Albanian border (Peshkëpi incident), with two soldiers killed. Responsibility for the attack was taken by MAVI (Northern Epirus Liberation Front), which officially ceased to exist at the end of World War II. This incident triggered a serious crisis in Albanian-Greek relations.
 The house of Himara's ethnic Greek mayor, Vasil Bollano, has been the target of a bomb attack twice, in 2004 and again in May 2010.
 On August 12, 2010, ethnic tensions soared after ethnic Greek shopkeeper Aristotelis Goumas was killed when his motorcycle was hit by a car driven by three Albanian youths with whom Goumas allegedly had an altercation when they demanded that he not speak Greek to them in his store. Outraged locals blocked the main highway between Vlore and Saranda and demanded reform and increased local Himariote representation in the local police force. The incident was condemned by both the Greek and Albanian governments, and three suspects are currently in custody awaiting trial.
The killing of Konstantinos Katsifas in Bularat, close to the Greek-Albanian border during the Greek national celebrations on the 28th October 2018. He was shot dead by the RENEA special forces of the Albanian police near the village after allegedly opening fire against the Albanian police. Early Greek media reports mention that this happened as they tried to lower the Greek flag he had raised at a cemetery in honour of fallen Greek soldiers. Later reporting from sources in the Greek police dismissed these accounts as baseless. The Albanian police reports that the events that led to his death began when he was approached by police vehicles after seen shooting in the air.

See also
 Albanisation
 Greek nationalism
 Chameria
 Enosis
 Epirus
 Autonomous Republic of Northern Epirus
 Northern Epirote Declaration of Independence
 Protocol of Corfu
 Postage stamps and postal history of Northern Epirus
 List of historic Greek countries and regions

References

Explanatory notes

Citations

Bibliography

History

Current topics

Further reading

External links

Ethnographic map of Albania and neighbors, showing concentration of Greeks in Northern Epirus
UNPO profile of the Greek minority in Albania
Albania: the Greek minority by Human Rights Watch
Assessment for Greeks in Albania by the Minorities at Risk (MAR) Project
Greeks of Albania and Albanians in Greece by the Greek Helsinki Monitor
Southern Albania, Northern Epirus: Survey of a Disputed Ethnological Boundary by Tom J. Winnifrith
Research Foundation on Northern Epirus (I.B.E.)
Northern Epirus: Hellenism Through Time
Northern Epirot Youth
Northern Epirus News Agency
The Government of Epirus in Exile
Unofficial Flag

 
Greek nationalism